The Gladiators (alternate title The Peace Game) is a 1969 Swedish drama/science fiction film directed by Peter Watkins.

Plot

In order to prevent a Third World War, the superpowers decide to introduce "international peace games," a deadly miniature battle fought between small teams of drafted soldiers from each country and broadcast on TV around the world as the most popular reality TV programme.

Cast
 Arthur Pentelow as British General
 Frederick Danner as British Staff Officer
 Hans Bendrik as Capt. Davidsson
 Daniel Harle as French Officer
 Hans Berger as West German Officer
 Rosario Gianetti as American Officer
 Tim Yum as Chinese Staff Officer
 Kenneth Lo as Chinese Colonel
 Björn Franzen as Swedish Colonel
 Christer Gynge as Assistant Controller
 Jürgen Schilling as East German Officer
 Stefan Dillan as Russian Officer
 Ugo Chiari as Italian Officer
 Chandrakant Desai as Indian Officer
 George Harris as Nigerian Officer
 Pik-Sen Lim as C-2

See also
 The Challenge (1970)

References

External links
 

Swedish science fiction films
English-language Swedish films
1960s science fiction films
1969 films
Films directed by Peter Watkins
Films about death games
Cold War films
1960s Swedish films